The Terrorist Financing Convention (formally, the International Convention for the Suppression of the Financing of Terrorism) is a 1999 United Nations treaty designed to criminalize acts of financing acts of terrorism. The convention also seeks to promote police and judicial co-operation to prevent, investigate and punish the financing of such acts. As of October 2018, the treaty has been ratified by 188 states; in terms of universality, it is therefore one of the most successful anti-terrorism treaties in history.

Content
Article 2.1 defines the crime of terrorist financing as the offense committed by "any person" who "by any means, directly or indirectly, unlawfully and willfully, provides or collects funds with the intention that they should be used or in the knowledge that they are to be used, in full or in part, in order to carry out" an act "intended to cause death or serious bodily injury to a civilian, or to any other person not taking an active part in the hostilities in a situation of armed conflict, when the purpose of such act, by its nature or context, is to intimidate a population, or to compel a government or an international organization to do or to abstain from doing any act."

State parties to this treaty also commit themselves to the freezing and seizure of funds intended to be used for terrorist activities and to share the forfeited funds with all state parties. Moreover, state parties commit themselves not to use bank secrecy as a justification for refusing to co-operate in the suppression of terrorist financing.

Entry into force and ratifications
The treaty entered into force on 10 April 2002. It has been ratified by 188 states, which includes all but eight member states of the United Nations plus the Cook Islands, the Holy See, and Niue. It has not been ratified by Burundi, Chad, Eritrea, Iran, Somalia, South Sudan, and Tuvalu. (Burundi and Somalia have signed the convention but have not yet ratified it.)

Impact

In 2017 Ukraine opened a case against Russia for involvement and financing of military occupied Autonomous Republic of Crimea and part of Donbas.

See also
 Definition of terrorism
 International conventions on terrorism
 United Nations General Assembly Sixth Committee (Legal)

References

Further reading
 ASIL, Conventions on the Suppression of Terrorist Bombings and on Financing, 96 American Journal of International Law, 255–258.(2002)
 C.F. Diaz-Paniagua, Negotiating terrorism: The negotiation dynamics of four UN counter-terrorism treaties, 1997–2005, City University of New York (2008).
 Roberto Lavalle, The International Convention for the Suppression of the Financing of Terrorism, 60 Heidelberg Journal of International Law 491-510 (2000).
 Introductory note by Pierre Klein, procedural history note and audiovisual material on the International Convention for the Suppression of the Financing of Terrorism in the Historic Archives of the United Nations Audiovisual Library of International Law

External links
1999 Text.
 Status of ratifications.

Financing
United Nations treaties
Treaties concluded in 1999
Treaties entered into force in 2002
Treaties of the Afghan Transitional Administration
Treaties of Albania
Treaties of Algeria
Treaties of Andorra
Treaties of Angola
Treaties of Antigua and Barbuda
Treaties of Argentina
Treaties of Armenia
Treaties of Australia
Treaties of Austria
Treaties of Azerbaijan
Treaties of the Bahamas
Treaties of Bahrain
Treaties of Bangladesh
Treaties of Barbados
Treaties of Belarus
Treaties of Belgium
Treaties of Belize
Treaties of Benin
Treaties of Bhutan
Treaties of Bolivia
Treaties of Bosnia and Herzegovina
Treaties of Botswana
Treaties of Brazil
Treaties of Brunei
Treaties of Bulgaria
Treaties of Burkina Faso
Treaties of Cambodia
Treaties of Cameroon
Treaties of Canada
Treaties of Cape Verde
Treaties of the Central African Republic
Treaties of Chile
Treaties of the People's Republic of China
Treaties of Colombia
Treaties of the Comoros
Treaties of the Republic of the Congo
Treaties of the Cook Islands
Treaties of Costa Rica
Treaties of Ivory Coast
Treaties of Croatia
Treaties of Cuba
Treaties of Cyprus
Treaties of the Czech Republic
Treaties of North Korea
Treaties of the Democratic Republic of the Congo
Treaties of Denmark
Treaties of Djibouti
Treaties of Dominica
Treaties of the Dominican Republic
Treaties of East Timor
Treaties of Ecuador
Treaties of Egypt
Treaties of El Salvador
Treaties of Equatorial Guinea
Treaties of Estonia
Treaties of Ethiopia
Treaties of Fiji
Treaties of Finland
Treaties of France
Treaties of Gabon
Treaties of the Gambia
Treaties of Georgia (country)
Treaties of Germany
Treaties of Ghana
Treaties of Greece
Treaties of Grenada
Treaties of Guatemala
Treaties of Guinea
Treaties of Guinea-Bissau
Treaties of Guyana
Treaties of Haiti
Treaties of the Holy See
Treaties of Honduras
Treaties of Hungary
Treaties of Iceland
Treaties of India
Treaties of Indonesia
Treaties of Iran
Treaties of Iraq
Treaties of Ireland
Treaties of Israel
Treaties of Italy
Treaties of Jamaica
Treaties of Japan
Treaties of Jordan
Treaties of Kazakhstan
Treaties of Kenya
Treaties of Kiribati
Treaties of Kuwait
Treaties of Kyrgyzstan
Treaties of Laos
Treaties of Latvia
Treaties of Lebanon
Treaties of Lesotho
Treaties of Liberia
Treaties of the Libyan Arab Jamahiriya
Treaties of Liechtenstein
Treaties of Lithuania
Treaties of Luxembourg
Treaties of Madagascar
Treaties of Malawi
Treaties of Malaysia
Treaties of the Maldives
Treaties of Mali
Treaties of Malta
Treaties of the Marshall Islands
Treaties of Mauritania
Treaties of Mauritius
Treaties of Mexico
Treaties of the Federated States of Micronesia
Treaties of Monaco
Treaties of Mongolia
Treaties of Montenegro
Treaties of Morocco
Treaties of Mozambique
Treaties of Myanmar
Treaties of Namibia
Treaties of Nauru
Treaties of Nepal
Treaties of the Netherlands
Treaties of New Zealand
Treaties of Nicaragua
Treaties of Niger
Treaties of Nigeria
Treaties of Niue
Treaties of Norway
Treaties of Oman
Treaties of Pakistan
Treaties of Palau
Treaties of Panama
Treaties of Papua New Guinea
Treaties of Paraguay
Treaties of Peru
Treaties of the Philippines
Treaties of Poland
Treaties of Portugal
Treaties of Qatar
Treaties of South Korea
Treaties of Moldova
Treaties of Romania
Treaties of Russia
Treaties of Rwanda
Treaties of Samoa
Treaties of San Marino
Treaties of São Tomé and Príncipe
Treaties of Saudi Arabia
Treaties of Senegal
Treaties of Serbia and Montenegro
Treaties of Seychelles
Treaties of Sierra Leone
Treaties of Singapore
Treaties of Slovakia
Treaties of Slovenia
Treaties of the Solomon Islands
Treaties of South Africa
Treaties of Spain
Treaties of Sri Lanka
Treaties of Saint Kitts and Nevis
Treaties of Saint Lucia
Treaties of Saint Vincent and the Grenadines
Treaties of the Republic of the Sudan (1985–2011)
Treaties of Suriname
Treaties of Eswatini
Treaties of Sweden
Treaties of Switzerland
Treaties of Syria
Treaties of Tajikistan
Treaties of Thailand
Treaties of North Macedonia
Treaties of Togo
Treaties of Tonga
Treaties of Trinidad and Tobago
Treaties of Tunisia
Treaties of Turkey
Treaties of Turkmenistan
Treaties of Uganda
Treaties of Ukraine
Treaties of the United Arab Emirates
Treaties of the United Kingdom
Treaties of Tanzania
Treaties of the United States
Treaties of Uruguay
Treaties of Uzbekistan
Treaties of Vanuatu
Treaties of Venezuela
Treaties of Vietnam
Treaties of Yemen
Treaties of Zambia
Treaties of Zimbabwe
1999 in New York City
Treaties adopted by United Nations General Assembly resolutions
Treaties extended to Aruba
Treaties extended to the Netherlands Antilles
Treaties extended to Jersey
Treaties extended to Guernsey
Treaties extended to the Isle of Man
Treaties extended to the British Virgin Islands
Treaties extended to Hong Kong
Treaties extended to Macau
Treaties extended to Bermuda
Treaties extended to Anguilla
Treaties extended to Gibraltar